Nai Suwunna is a Burmese politician who currently serves as Minister of Labour of NUG and as the president of Mon State Interim Coordination Committee (MSICC).

He was appointed by the Committee Representing Pyidaungsu Hluttaw as the Minister of Labour Affairs  in the National Unity Government of Myanmar on 3 May 2021.

References

Labour ministers of Myanmar
Living people
Year of birth missing (living people)